The following railroads have been called International Railroad or International Railway:
International Railway of Maine
International Railway (New York – Ontario)
International Railway (Quebec)
International Railroad (Texas)
International Railway (New Brunswick)